The Rachel Carson Award is awarded each spring by the National Audubon Society's Women in Conservation to recognize "women whose immense talent, expertise, and energy greatly advance conservation and the environmental movement locally and globally". Honorees are drawn from diverse backgrounds, including the worlds of journalism, academics, business, science, entertainment, philanthropy and law.

The award is presented to honorees each May at the Rachel Carson Award Luncheon. The Luncheon, which is held annually at New York City's Plaza Hotel. Proceeds from the Luncheon support Audubon's Long Island Sound Campaign. (With more than 28 million people living within 50 miles of its shores, the Sound is home to 10 percent of the U.S. population. Unfortunately, it has undergone unprecedented pollution, habitat loss, and ecosystem disruption. The crisis in this significant estuary has led to a campaign of national importance.) Additionally, Audubon's Women in Conservation Program, in conjunction with Audubon's Rachel Carson Awards Council, supports a website connecting women of all ages to extraordinary leaders in the environmental movement and to the great environmental issues of our time. In its mission to support environmental opportunities for girls and young women, Audubon's Women in Conservation also supports a prominent internship program and hosts an educational school panel in which past Rachel Carson Award honorees speak at a local all-girls school.

The award is named in honor of Rachel Carson, a monumental figure of the 20th century and the undisputed founder of the modern environmental movement. Each year the Rachel Carson Award is created by Tiffany & Company. The Rachel Carson Awards Council was founded by Allison Whipple Rockefeller in 2004.

Award recipients
Source: Audubon Society

2019
 Rose H. Harvey
 Garden Club of America

2018 Honorees
 Gina McCarthy, Former EPA Administrator and Professor of Public Health Practice at Harvard T.H. Chan School of Public Health
 Mary Powell, President and CEO, Vermont Green Mountain Power
 Dorceta Taylor, Director of Diversity, Equity, and Inclusion & James E. Crowfoot Collegiate Professor at University of Michigan School for Environment and Sustainability

2017 Honorees
 Jamie Rappaport Clark, President and CEO, Defenders of Wildlife
 Dr. Heidi Cullen, Chief Scientist, Climate Central
 Anne Thompson, Chief Environmental Affairs Correspondent, NBC News

2016 Honorees
 Dominique Browning Co-Founder & Director of Moms Clean Air Force
 Rebecca Moore Founder and Director of Google Earth Outreach
 Dr. Kathryn Sullivan Under Secretary of Commerce for Oceans and Atmosphere and Administrator of the National Oceanic and Atmospheric Administration

2015 Honorees
 Warrie Price President and Founder of the Battery Park Conservancy
 Flo Stone President and Founder of the Environmental Film Festival in the Nation's Capital

2014 Honorees
 Ellen Futter President of the American Museum of Natural History
 Kaiulani Lee Playwright and Performer of “A Sense of Wonder”
 Nell Newman Co-Founder and President of Newman’s Own Organics

2013 Honorees
 Marian Heiskell Conservationist and Philanthropist
 Lady Bird Johnson First Lady and Environmental Pioneer

2012 Honorees

 Sally Bingham President, The Regeneration Project/Interfaith Power & Light
 L. Hunter Lovins President, Natural Capitalism Solutions
 Janette Sadik-Khan Commissioner, New York City Department of Transportation

2011 Honorees
 Maya Lin Artist, Architect, and Environmentalist
 Sigourney Weaver Actress and Environmental Activist

2010 Honorees
 Suzanne Lewis Superintendent, Yellowstone National Park
 Isabella Rossellini Actress, Director, Writer & Environmental Activist
 Dr. Beth Stevens Senior Vice President Environmental Affairs, Disney World Wide Services
 The Tiffany & Co. Foundation Fernanda M. Kellogg, President

2009 Honorees
 Dr. Sylvia Earle National Geographic Explorer in Residence; Founder, Deep Search Foundation
 Sally Jewell Secretary of the Interior
 Elizabeth Cushman Titus Putnam Founding President, Student Conservation Association
 NBC Universal's Green is Universal Initiative Elizabeth Colleton, Jane Evans and Susan Haspel

2008 Honorees
 Jean Clark, Norma Dana, Marguerite Purnell, Phyllis Cerf Wagner, and Elizabeth Barlow Rogers Central Park Conservancy
 Teresa Heinz Kerry Philanthropist
 Bette Midler Founder, New York Restoration Project

2007 Honorees
 Frances Beinecke President of the National Resources Defense Council (NRDC)
 Majora Carter Founder and Executive Director of Sustainable South Bronx
 Laurie David Global Warming Activist/Producer/Author
 Deirdre Imus Founder and President of the Deirdre Imus Environmental Center for Pediatric Oncology

2006 Honorees
 Kathleen Bader Former President and CEO of NatureWorks LLC
 Margie Ruddick Environmental Designer, Founder of Margie Ruddick Landscape

2005 Honorees
 Kay Kelley Arnold Vice President of Public Affairs, Entergy Corporation
 Bernadette Castro Former Commissioner, New York State Parks, Recreation and Historic Preservation
 Mae Jemison Founder, BioSentient Corporation
 Margaret Wittenberg Whole Foods Market Vice President of Global Communications and Quality Standards

2004 Honorees
 Jayni Chase Environmental Activist and Philanthropist
 Lynn Chase Wildlife Artist, Philanthropist
 Maria Rodale Chairman, Rodale Publishing
 Peggy M. Shepard Executive Director, West Harlem Environmental Action, Inc.
 Alice Waters Chef, Author, Restaurateur

See also

 List of environmental awards

References

External links 
 Official Site of the Rachel Carson Award

Awards established in 2004
Environmental awards
National Audubon Society
Award